is a Japanese actor, voice actor and singer.

Biography

He started as a child actor at Sanno Production. In April 2014, he joined Sigma Seven E and he remained for six years until he was transferred to its main division on July 1, 2020. He was announced as a part of Kiramune's unit SparQlew on November 19, 2017. On August 18, 2021, it was announced Chiba tested positive for COVID-19. On January 1, 2023, he announced that he has left Sigma Seven and is now joining the agency Toy's Factory.

Filmography

Anime
2004
 Curry No Kuni No Koba-ru, Koba-ru

2011
 Shōwa Monogatari, Kōhei Yamazaki

2015
 Haikyu!! Second Season, Kazuma Bobata, Tarō Onagawa
 Seraph of the End, Yūji

2016
 Alderamin on the Sky, Azan
 All Out!!, Kenji Gion
 B-Project: Kodou*Ambitious, Akane Fudo

2017
 Classroom of the Elite, Kiyotaka Ayanokōji
 The Idolm@ster SideM, Hayato Akiyama
 Tsuki ga Kirei, Kotarō Azumi

2018
 Banana Fish, Sing Soo-Ling
 Cells at Work!, B Cell
 Iroduku: The World in Colors, Yuito Aoi
 Xuan Yuan Sword Luminary, Shang Yue

2019
 Dororo, Tahōmaru
 Fire Force, Yū
 Stars Align, Mou Tanaka
 We Never Learn, Visitor

2020
 Gleipnir, Ikeuchi
 I'm Standing on a Million Lives, Shūji
 Toilet-Bound Hanako-kun, Kou Minamoto

2021
 86, Shinei Nouzen
 Horimiya, Makio Tanihara
 Platinum End, Mizukiyo Minamikawa
 Project Scard: Scar on the Praeter, Kazuma Arashiba
 Skate-Leading Stars, Sota Jonouchi
 Visual Prison,  Ange Yuki

2022
 Beast Tamer, Rein
 Blue Lock, Yūdai Imamura
 Classroom of the Elite 2nd Season, Kiyotaka Ayanokōji
 Play It Cool, Guys, Sōma Shiki
 Tiger & Bunny 2, Mr. Black / Subaru Sengoku
 Tribe Nine, Kazuki Aoyama
 Ya Boy Kongming!, Kabetaijin

2023
 Ao no Orchestra, Hajime Aono
 Ayakashi Triangle, Matsuri Kazamaki (male)
 Bullbuster, Tetsurō Okino
 Bungo Stray Dogs 4, Sigma
 Classroom of the Elite 3rd Season, Kiyotaka Ayanokōji

Anime films
 Shōwa Monogatari (2011), Kōhei Yamazaki

Video games
 Boku no Natsuyasumi 3, Boku
 The Idolmaster SideM, Hayato Akiyama
 Star Revolution☆88 Seiza no Idol Kakumei, Rito Harima
 B-Project Muteki*Dangerous, Akane Fudou
 Seven Knights: Time Wanderer, Sandy 
 NEO: The World Ends With You, Kaie Ono 
 Summer Pockets Reflection Blue, Takahara Hairi
 Paradigm Paradox, Ayumu Mamiya
 Arknights, Chestnut
 Anonymous;Code, Pollon Takaoka
 Touken Ranbu, Hacchou Nenbutsu

Drama CDs 
 Koisuru Sharehouse ~which do you choose~ vol 2, Ayumu Sakaguchi

Radio 
 Chiba Shoya・Nogami Sho no ShofukuShorai
Chiba Shoya no to be night

Dubbing 
Night at the Museum: Secret of the Tomb, Nick Daley (Skyler Gisondo)
White House Farm, Jeremy Bamber (Freddie Fox)

References

External links
 Official agency profile 
 

1995 births
Living people
Japanese male child actors
Japanese male pop singers
Japanese male video game actors
Japanese male voice actors
Male voice actors from Tokyo